Pretty in Pink is a 1986 American teen romantic comedy-drama film about love and social cliques in American high schools in the 1980s. A cult classic, it is commonly identified as a "Brat Pack" film. It was directed by Howard Deutch, produced by Lauren Shuler Donner, and written by John Hughes, who also served as co-executive producer. The film was named after a song by the Psychedelic Furs, and the film's soundtrack, which has been acclaimed as "among the most brilliant in modern cinema", features a re-recorded version of the song. Orchestral Manoeuvres in the Dark's "If You Leave" became an international hit and charted at number four on the US Billboard Hot 100 in May 1986.

Plot

High school senior Andie Walsh lives with her underemployed working-class father, Jack, in a Chicago suburb. Andie's best friend, the outsider Phil "Duckie" Dale is in love with her, but is afraid to tell her how he truly feels. In school, Duckie and Andie, along with their friends, are harassed and bullied by the arrogant "richie" kids, specifically Benny Hanson and her boyfriend, Steff McKee, who finds Andie attractive and secretly resents having been rejected by her.

While working after school at a record store called TRAX, Andie starts talking about her school's senior prom to her manager, Iona, who advises Andie to go, despite not having a date. Blane McDonough, one of the preppy boys and Steff's best friend, falls for Andie and eventually asks her out.

On the night of the date, Andie waits for Blane at TRAX, but he is late. Duckie enters and asks Andie to go out with him, but she ignores him. When Blane arrives, Duckie becomes upset and argues with Andie before storming off. Blane brings Andie to Steff's house party, where Andie is mistreated by the rich partygoers. Andie then brings Blane to a local nightclub, where Iona is sitting with Duckie, who is hostile toward Blane. After another argument with Duckie, Andie and Blane walk out of the club. Andie tells Blane that she wants to go home, but refuses to let him bring her there, admitting that she doesn't want him to see where she lives. She eventually allows him to drop her off and he asks her to the prom and they share their first kiss. Andie visits Iona the next day to talk about the date. Meanwhile, Blane, pressured by Steff and his rich friends, begins distancing himself from Andie.

Jack presents Andie with a pink dress that he has bought for her. However, they begin to argue because Jack has been lying about going to a full-time job. Jack breaks down, revealing that he is still bitter and depressed about his wife having left him. At school, Andie confronts Blane for avoiding her and not returning her calls. When asked about the prom, he claims that he had already asked somebody else but had forgotten. Andie calls Blane a liar and tells him that he is ashamed of being seen with her because he knows his rich friends will not approve. Andie runs away as a teary-eyed Blane leaves, with Steff trashing Andie as he passes. Duckie overhears Steff and attacks him in the hallway. The two fight before teachers intervene. Andie goes to Iona, upset about what happened, and asks for Iona's old prom dress.

Using the fabric from Iona's dress and the dress that her father had bought, Andie creates a pink prom dress. When she arrives at the prom, Andie has second thoughts about braving the crowd on her own until she sees Duckie. They reconcile and walk into the ballroom hand in hand. As a drunk Steff begins mocking the couple, Blane confronts him and finally realizes that Steff resents Andie because she had turned down his advances. He calls Steff out on his spoiled and entitled attitude, saying that he no longer wishes to associate with him. Blane shakes Duckie's hand and apologizes to Andie, telling her that he always believed in her and that he will always love her, kissing her cheek before walking out. Duckie concedes that Blane is not like the other rich kids at school and advises Andie to go after him, joking that he will never take her to another prom if she does not. Duckie then sees a girl smiling at him, signaling him to come over and dance with her. Andie catches up with Blane in the parking lot and they kiss.

Cast

 Molly Ringwald as Andie Walsh
 Harry Dean Stanton as Jack Walsh
 Jon Cryer as Philip F. "Duckie" Dale
 Annie Potts as Iona
 James Spader as Steff McKee
 Andrew McCarthy as Blane McDonough
 Kate Vernon as Benny Hanson
 Andrew Dice Clay as Bouncer
 Kristy Swanson as Duckette
 Alexa Kenin as Jena Hoeman
 Dweezil Zappa as Simon
 Gina Gershon as Trombley
 Margaret Colin as English teacher
 Maggie Roswell as Mrs. Dietz

Charlie Sheen was considered for the role of Blane but Ringwald convinced the film makers to cast McCarthy instead. Anthony Michael Hall turned down the role of Duckie because he didn’t want to be typecast. Ringwald lobbied for Robert Downey Jr. to be cast as Duckie but agreed that Cryer made sense in light of the film's revised ending. Jennifer Beals turned down the role of Andie Walsh. Jodie Foster, Sarah Jessica Parker, Tatum O'Neal and Lori Loughlin were also considered.

Changed ending
Originally, the film portrayed Andie and Duckie ending up together. However, test audiences booed this ending. John Hughes wrote a new five-page ending where Andie and Blane get together instead. This was shot several months after the film wrapped production, and was filmed in one day on a soundstage designed to look like the Los Angeles hotel ballroom where the first ending had been filmed.  When called back to film the new scene, Andrew McCarthy was in pre-production for a stage play, and had lost weight and cut his hair for the stage role, so he was fitted with a wig for the re-shoot. Molly Ringwald had anticipated that audiences would be dissatisfied with the original ending, saying: "It didn't make sense to have the entire movie be this Cinderella story [yet] she doesn't get to end up with the guy she wants." Ringwald has said Duckie was based on her best friend, who was gay and with whom she "had an extremely nonromantic relationship". Jon Cryer has stated that he was shocked that the test audience was unhappy about the pairing, and felt that the whole film was built around Andie and Duckie ending up together. Hughes aimed "to protect Duckie's character" in the new ending by having another girl at the prom show interest in him, played by Kristy Swanson in her first theatrical film role and credited as "Duckette". Paramount executives were also apprehensive about the original ending, worried that the film might be perceived as classist and as suggesting that wealthy people and poor people should not interact. Orchestral Manoeuvres in the Dark had written the song "Goddess of Love" for the original ending (which they later rewrote and released on the album The Pacific Age). Hughes didn't consider the song a good fit for the newly re-shot Andie/Blane ending and asked the band to write something else. With only two days before going on tour, OMD wrote "If You Leave" in less than 24 hours. Paramount has said that they have been unable to locate the footage of the original ending.

Restoring the original ending, with Andie and Duckie ending up together, was a shard quest in Ernest Cline's Ready Player Two.

Novel
The film was adapted into a novel written by H. B. Gilmour and Randi Reisfield, released in 1986. It was published by Bantam Books (. ). The book was written before the last scene was changed, so it has the original ending in which Andie ends up with Duckie instead of Blane.

Release
Pretty in Pink was the top-grossing film for the week of March 12, 1986.  The film earned US$6.1 million during its opening weekend and $40.5 million during its theatrical run. It was the 22nd-highest-grossing film of 1986.

Reception
As of November 2022, Rotten Tomatoes reported that 73% of 56 surveyed critics gave the film a positive review, with an average rating of 6.3/10. The site's consensus reads: "Molly Ringwald gives an outstanding performance in this sweet, intelligent teen comedy that takes an ancient premise and injects it with insight and wit."

Roger Ebert gave the film three stars out of four, criticizing the "old, old, old" plot but praising the performances of Molly Ringwald and Annie Potts, and calling it "a heartwarming and mostly truthful movie, with some nice touches of humor." Janet Maslin of The New York Times wrote, "Fortunately, the actors are mostly likable, and the story is told gently enough to downplay both its trendiness and its conventionality." James Harwood of Variety wrote, "In his mid-30s, John Hughes' much-vaunted teen thinking now seems to be maturing a bit in Pretty in Pink, a rather intelligent (if not terribly original) look at adolescent insecurities ... Teamed with Hughes for the third time, Molly Ringwald is herself growing as an actress, lending Pink a solid emotional center that largely boils down to making the audience care about her." Pauline Kael of The New Yorker wrote that Ringwald "carries the movie, though she has nothing particularly interesting to do or say," and called the film "slight and vapid, with the consistency of watery Jello." Gene Siskel of the Chicago Tribune gave the film one-and-a-half stars out of four, faulting a "tired script" and Cryer's "one-note performance," though he found Ringwald "absolutely beguiling." Patrick Goldstein of the Los Angeles Times called the film "delightful," adding that "what makes Pretty in Pink such a satisfying, big-hearted film isn't its creaky story line or its somewhat unconvincing conclusion, but the way it lets us watch kids through their own eyes, exploring feelings instead of making caricatures of them. Written by Hughes and directed by newcomer Howard Deutch, the movie neatly captures the nuances of youth, reminding us how the most casual remark can unleash a flood of insecurities." Paul Attanasio of The Washington Post wrote that "for the most part, Pretty in Pink works from a standard formula—rich boy, poor girl—and does little to tweak or reinvent it."

Legacy
The main cast of Pretty in Pink was featured in an October 15, 2010 issue of Entertainment Weekly that featured reunions with the casts of landmark films and television shows.

Soundtrack

As with previous films by John Hughes, Pretty in Pink featured a soundtrack composed mostly of new wave music. While director Howard Deutch originally intended the film to primarily contain theme music, Hughes influenced Deutch's decision to use post-punk music throughout the film. The title song by the Psychedelic Furs acted as a bit of inspiration for the film and was re-recorded specifically for the film's opening sequence in a version that was less raw than the original version that appeared on the 1981 album Talk Talk Talk. "Left of Center" was remixed by Arthur Baker. The first track, "If You Leave", by Orchestral Manoeuvres in the Dark, was written in 1985 specifically for the film. In addition to their soundtrack song "Shellshock", New Order also contributed an instrumental version of  "Thieves Like Us"  and the instrumental "Elegia", both of which appear in the film but not on the soundtrack. The Rave-Ups, who appear in the film performing "Positively Lost Me" and "Shut-Up" from their Town and Country album, do not have any songs on the soundtrack album. Nik Kershaw's "Wouldn't It Be Good" appears on the soundtrack in a version by former Three Dog Night vocalist Danny Hutton's band, Danny Hutton Hitters. The Smiths' "Please Please Please Let Me Get What I Want" appears on the soundtrack and was later covered by the Autumns for the 2000 Isn't She Still... The Original Motion Picture Soundtrack Revisited album. Also noteworthy is the inclusion of Echo & the Bunnymen's "Bring On the Dancing Horses", which, according to the liner notes of the CD release of the band's compilation album Songs to Learn & Sing, was recorded specifically for the film.

The film also includes Otis Redding's "Try a Little Tenderness", to which Duckie lip-synchs in the film, the Association's "Cherish" and Talk Back's "Rudy". These three tracks do not appear on the official soundtrack album.

The soundtrack was released on vinyl by A&M Records in 1986. It was re-released in 2013 as a limited edition on pink-colored vinyl.

The album was listed on the "Best Movie Soundtracks: The 15 Film Music Compilations That'll Change Your Life" list in The Huffington Post and "The 25 Greatest Soundtracks of All Time" list in Rolling Stone. AllMusic rated it four stars out of five.

Charts

Singles released

References

Bibliography

External links

 
 
 
 

1986 films
1986 directorial debut films
1980s coming-of-age comedy films
1980s high school films
1986 romantic comedy films
1980s teen comedy films
1980s teen romance films
American coming-of-age comedy films
American high school films
American romantic comedy films
American teen comedy films
American teen romance films
Coming-of-age romance films
1980s English-language films
Films about interclass romance
Films about proms
Films about dresses
Films directed by Howard Deutch
Films produced by Lauren Shuler Donner
Films shot in Los Angeles
Films with screenplays by John Hughes (filmmaker)
Paramount Pictures films
Films about father–daughter relationships
1980s American films